The 2003 FIA Sportscar Championship Lausitz was the second race for the 2003 FIA Sportscar Championship season held at EuroSpeedway Lausitz and ran a distance of two hours, thirty minutes.  It took place on May 10, 2003.

This race was run in support for the Champ Car German 500.

Official results
Class winners in bold.  Cars failing to complete 75% of winner's distance marked as Not Classified (NC).

Statistics
 Pole Position - #1 Racing for Holland - 1:38.173
 Distance - 394.458 km
 Average Speed - 156.707 km/h

References

L
FIA Sportscar